Villaseta is a village in Sicily, part of the municipality of Agrigento, with a population of roughly 6,300.

References

Cities and towns in Sicily
Agrigento